Critical Stage is the 1994 debut album by the Belgian electro-industrial act Suicide Commando.

Track listing
All songs written by Johan Van Roy, except where noted

References
Critical Stage at Discogs

1994 debut albums
Suicide Commando albums